Saint-Prix may refer to the following places in France:

 Saint-Prix, Allier, a commune in the department of Allier
 Saint-Prix, Ardèche, a commune in the department of Ardèche
 Saint-Prix, Saône-et-Loire, a commune in the department of Saône-et-Loire
 Saint-Prix, Val-d'Oise, a commune in the department of Val-d'Oise
 Saint-Prix-lès-Arnay, a commune in the department of Côte-d'Or
 Talus-Saint-Prix, a commune in the department of Marne

Saint-Prix may also refer to:
 Saint-Prix (Bishop of Clermont) (625–676)
 Prætextatus (Bishop of Rouen) (died 586), a sixth-century saint also known as Saint Prix
 Saint-Prix, an 18th-century/19th-century French actor